Sang-e Sefid (also Romanized as Sang-e Sefīd; also known as Sang-e Safīd and Sang-i-Safīd) is a village in Seyyed Shahab Rural District, in the Central District of Tuyserkan County, Hamadan Province, Iran. At the 2006 census, its population was 211, in 58 families.

References 

Populated places in Tuyserkan County